Hurricane Norman combined with a weather front to cause significant impacts across California in early September 1978. The fourteenth named storm, eleventh hurricane, and sixth major hurricane of the 1978 Pacific season, Norman originated from an African tropical wave that spawned an area of disturbed weather south of Acapulco. The system curved northward, passing into cooler waters that brought an end to its status as a tropical cyclone on September 6. However, its remnants combined with an trough and front over California, contributing to locally heavy rainfall that caused dozens of traffic accidents and sporadic power outages. In higher elevations, the system produced accumulating snow which stranded and killed many hikers throughout Sierra Nevada. Most heavily affected was California's raisin crop, which suffered a record-breaking 95 percent loss. In all, Norman killed eight people and caused over $300 million in damage.

Meteorological history 

This disturbance appeared to have ties to a tropical wave that originated from Africa. The system moved west and organized, becoming a tropical depression by 18:00 UTC on August 30 and further intensifying into Tropical Storm Norman six hours later. A few hours later, forecasters at the Eastern Pacific Hurricane Center observed the system's small eye for the first time via visible satellite imagery.

Norman intensified rapidly on September 2. It intensified into a Category 2 hurricane on the Saffir–Simpson scale around 00:00 UTC but vaulted to Category 4 intensity six hours later. The hurricane passed over the northeastern coast of Socorro Island between 17:00–18:00 UTC on September 2. A few hours later, the first aircraft reconnaissance plane intercepted the cyclone, reporting a closed eyewall  in diameter. Upper-level high pressure centered over Baja California continued to direct the cyclone west-northwest, which brought the system over increasingly cool waters.

A second aircraft reconnaissance plane investigated Norman around 18:00 UTC on September 3, and the storm was operationally downgraded to a Category 2 hurricane as its inner core became ill-defined. Later analysis suggests that the hurricane weakened to Category 3 intensity at this time. By September 4, Norman was located on the southwest side of upper-level ridging and embedded within strong southwesterly flow aloft. It rapidly weakened to Category 1 intensity by 00:00 UTC that day before falling under hurricane intensity eighteen hours later. The Hurricane Hunters intercepted Norman for a final time around 17:30 UTC on September 5. The cyclone barely maintained tropical storm-force winds at that time, and indeed, it was downgraded to a tropical depression 30 minutes later. The former hurricane accelerated north-northeast, transitioning into an extratropical cyclone around 06:00 UTC on September 6. It degenerated to a disturbance northeast of Los Angeles after 00:00 UTC on September 7.

Preparations and impact 

Offshore the coastline of Mexico, the bodies of a father and one of his sons were recovered after rough seas overwhelmed their boat. The father's second son washed ashore while unconscious and was transported to a hospital in Cabo San Lucas by two hikers, where communications were severed in the wake of the cyclone. Meanwhile, in advance of Norman in California, a weather front contributed to rainfall that staved off wildfire risk in a normally dry time of the year there. However, as this front interacted with the remnants of the cyclone, it prompted flash flood and mudslide warnings across southern portions of the state, in addition to heavy surf and small craft advisories along the coast. Hundreds of rescues were carried out by lifeguards, including a record 586 people at Newport Beach, an additional 200 individuals throughout Orange County, 62 people at all San Diego beaches, and 10 swimmers in Coronado. Two ships were slammed into their berths and a third had its steel mooring cable snapped in the Port of Los Angeles. A  oil tanker was also swept from its moorings. In Orange County, a  vessel and two barges were ripped from their anchors and ran aground in Dana Point Harbor.

The remnants of Norman combined with an upper-level trough over California to produce locally heavy rainfall. These rains slowed an outbreak of botulism among anseriformes in Tulare Lake, cutting weekly fatality rates in half. Several baseball games were canceled or rescheduled. Traffic accidents were reported along freeways between San Diego and Santa Barbara, including 21 traffic collisions with injuries near Ontario. One such accident on U.S. Route 50 near Twin Bridges resulted in the death of a 24-year-old man who collided head-on with another vehicle after swerving to avoid large rocks that had washed onto the road. Both the passenger of his vehicle, and the driver of the vehicle he collided with, were severely injured and hospitalized. On Interstate 10 in California,  gasoline truck collided with a tanker truck carrying nitrogen, causing the death of one man owing to severe head injuries as well as the hospitalization of the passenger. A truck overturned in a separate accident, spilling scrap iron over three lanes of the freeway and injuring one man as well. A 16-year-old boy was hospitalized after wrecking his car on wet roads in Riverside. California State Route 180 was closed for a time after being eclipsed by rocks and water. A portion of a street collapsed in Point Loma, San Diego. The storm also contributed to localized power outages affecting 15,000 customers, including 2,000 homes in Mission Bay, La Jolla, and Del Mar. These outages were primarily caused by power pole fires resultant from rainfall moistening an accumulation of dust on the insulators. Norman caused severe crop losses throughout California. The raisin crop in particular suffered the state's largest loss on record, with 95 percent of that crop destroyed. Agricultural losses exceeded $300 million. The cyclone inflicted an additional $300,000 in damage to roads, bridges, and private property across Inyo County.

The bodies of three men and a woman were recovered at higher elevations. All four of the deceased were dressed in summer-like clothing and had little other equipment with them. The freshly laid snow, followed by a blanket of fog across the region, slowed rescue efforts. Some 21 hikers near Convict Lake and Mount McGee were stranded but later recovered, and 3 others near Lake Italy were rescued as well. Initial reports suggested 17 hikers were also missing around Mount Whitney, but these individuals were later said to be part of a search and rescue team. Chains were temporarily required along Nevada State Route 431, and a traveler advisory was issued across northeastern portions of the state. A plane, harboring three travelers on a route from Porterville, California, to Reno, Nevada, also went missing in a mixture of rain and snow produced by the remnants of Norman and a nearby front. The Civil Air Patrol established search headquarters and readied aircraft to search the Sierra Nevada.

See also 

Other storms named Norman
1858 San Diego Hurricane
1939 California tropical storm 
Hurricane Ismael (1983)
Hurricane Ramon
List of California hurricanes

References 

Norman
Norman
Norman
1978 in California
1978 natural disasters in the United States